In electronics, a continuity test is the checking of an electric circuit to see if current flows (that it is in fact a complete circuit).
A continuity test is performed by placing a small voltage (wired in series with an LED or noise-producing component such as a piezoelectric speaker) across the chosen path.  If electron flow is inhibited by broken conductors, damaged components, or excessive resistance, the circuit is "open".

Devices that can be used to perform continuity tests include multimeters which measure current and specialized continuity testers which are cheaper, more basic devices, generally with a simple light bulb that lights up when current flows.

Usage 
A continuity test can be used to test switches, fuses, electrical connections, conductors and other components. A good fuse, for example, should have continuity.

An important application is the continuity test of a bundle of wires so as to find the two ends belonging to a particular one of these wires; there will be a negligible resistance between the "right" ends, and only between the "right" ends.

References

External links 
acmehowto.com - continuity test

Hardware testing